Grafenberg is a municipality in the district of Reutlingen in Baden-Württemberg in Germany.

References 

Towns in Baden-Württemberg
Reutlingen (district)